Peru competed at the 2012 Summer Olympics in London, from 27 July to 12 August 2012. This was the nation's seventeenth appearance at the Olympics, having only missed the 1952 Summer Olympics in Helsinki.

The Comité Olímpico Peruano sent a total of 16 athletes, 9 men and 7 women, to compete in 9 sports, tying its record with Barcelona in 1992. Three athletes had competed in Beijing, including taekwondo jin Peter López, who narrowly missed out on a medal in Beijing in the bronze medal match. Marathon runner Gladys Tejeda, who competed at her first Olympics, became the nation's first female flag bearer at the opening ceremony since 2000. Peru, however, failed to win a single Olympic medal, continuing a drought that began at the 1992 Summer Olympics in Barcelona, where Juan Giha won the silver for skeet shooting.

Athletics

Peruvian athletes have so far achieved qualifying standards in the following athletics events (up to a maximum of 3 athletes in each event at the 'A' Standard, and 1 at the 'B' Standard):

Key
 Note – Ranks given for track events are within the athlete's heat only
 Q = Qualified for the next round
 q = Qualified for the next round as a fastest loser or, in field events, by position without achieving the qualifying target
 NR = National record
 N/A = Round not applicable for the event
 Bye = Athlete not required to compete in round

Men

Women

Badminton

Judo

Peru has qualified 1 judoka

Rowing

Peru has qualified the following boat.

Men

Qualification Legend: FA=Final A (medal); FB=Final B (non-medal); FC=Final C (non-medal); FD=Final D (non-medal); FE=Final E (non-medal); FF=Final F (non-medal); SA/B=Semifinals A/B; SC/D=Semifinals C/D; SE/F=Semifinals E/F; Q=Quarterfinals; R=Repechage

Sailing

Peru has qualified 1 boat for each of the following events

Women

M = Medal race; EL = Eliminated – did not advance into the medal race;

Shooting

Men

Swimming

Peru qualified one athlete and has gained two "Universality places" from the FINA.

Men

Women

Taekwondo

Peru has qualified one man.

Weightlifting

Peru has qualified 1 athlete.

References

External links

Nations at the 2012 Summer Olympics
2012
2012 in Peruvian sport